Earl of Lanesborough was a title in the Peerage of Ireland. It was created in 1756 for Humphrey Butler, 2nd Viscount Lanesborough. The Butler family descended from Theophilus Butler, who represented County Cavan and Belturbet in the Irish House of Commons. In 1715 he was raised to the Peerage of Ireland as Baron Newtown-Butler, of the County of Fermanagh, with remainder to the heirs male of his father. He was succeeded according to the special remainder by his brother, Brinsley, the second Baron. He had previously represented Kells and Belturbet in the Irish Parliament. In 1728 he was created Viscount Lanesborough in the Peerage of Ireland. He was succeeded by his son, Humphrey, the aforementioned second Viscount, who was elevated to an earldom in 1756. The first Earl was succeeded by his son, Brinsley, the second Earl. He represented County Cavan in the Irish House of Commons. His grandson, the fifth Earl, sat in the British House of Lords as an Irish Representative Peer from 1849 to 1866. The latter was succeeded by his nephew, the sixth Earl. He served as Lord-Lieutenant of Cavan from 1876 to 1900 and was an Irish Representative Peer from 1870 to 1905. He was succeeded by his son, the seventh Earl. He was an Irish Representative Peer from 1913 to 1929. On his death the titles passed to his younger brother, the eighth Earl. The titles became extinct on the death of the latter's eldest son, the ninth Earl, in December 1998.

The Honourable John Butler, younger son of the first Viscount, was a member of the Irish Parliament for Newcastle between 1743 and 1783.

Butler family
The Butler family  trace their lineage back to county of Huntingdon and George Butler who resided at Fen Drayton in 1575 who had six sons one son Stephen Butler who settled in Belturbet County of Cavan in Ireland.
Stephen Butler's son Theophilus Butler was created Baron of Newtown-Butler and began family descent.

Baron Newtown-Butler (1715)
Theophilus Butler, 1st Baron Newtown-Butler ( – 1723)
Brinsley Butler, 2nd Baron Newtown-Butler (1670–1735) (created Viscount Lanesborough in 1728)

Viscount Lanesborough (1728)
Brinsley Butler, 1st Viscount Lanesborough (1670–1735)
Humphrey Butler, 2nd Viscount Lanesborough (c. 1700–1768) (created Earl of Lanesborough in 1756)

Earl of Lanesborough (1756)
Humphrey Butler, 1st Earl of Lanesborough (–1768)
Brinsley Butler, 2nd Earl of Lanesborough (1728–1779)
Robert Herbert Butler, 3rd Earl of Lanesborough (1759–1806)
Brinsley Butler, 4th Earl of Lanesborough (1783–1847)
George John Danvers Butler-Danvers, 5th Earl of Lanesborough (1794–1866)
John Vansittart Danvers Butler, 6th Earl of Lanesborough (1839–1905)
Charles John Brinsley Butler, 7th Earl of Lanesborough (1865–1929)
Henry Cavendish Butler, 8th Earl of Lanesborough (1868–1950)
Denis Anthony Brian Butler, 9th Earl of Lanesborough (1918–1998)

Male-line family tree

Arms

See also
Swithland Hall
Swithland
Newtownbutler
Lanesborough-Ballyleague
Carter-Campbell of Possil
Viscount Lanesborough
Lanesborough Hotel

References

Sources

Cracroftspeerage

Extinct earldoms in the Peerage of Ireland
 
Noble titles created in 1756